Haiku Depot is the native package manager for the Haiku operating system which was integrated into Haiku after its R1A4 release. Most applications on Haiku now run from their packages but are virtualised as virtual directories on the Be file system.

Haiku-Depot 
Haiku Depot is the GUI Package Manager for Haiku. It can be compared with Ubuntu Software Center, or similar software repositories. It makes it possible for the user to manage repositories, list and search available packages and pull out additional information regarding the packages. The additional information consists of screenshots, user ratings and translated package information such as description and change log.

The additional information is pulled out from a web application hosted by this project. The web application allows users to input and upload information about packages. Some information is uploaded by HaikuDepot itself, such as when a user creates or edits their rating and review/comment for a given package version.

Haiku-Depot Web App 

The Haiku-Depot Web Application is an online tool for working with the software packages of Haiku. It provides an Internet-Accessible catalog of the packages, a user-interface to manipulate the additional data, a repository of additional data and a mechanism to vend this additional data such as Screenshots, Iconography, Localizations and User-Feedbacks to HaikuDepot which is a desktop application for managing packages. <ref name=https://code.google.com/p/haiku-depot-web-app/

Development History 

At the BeGeistert Code Sprint 2013,Rene Gollent started to integrate the actual package management functionality into the HaikuDepot application. The basic package installation and uninstallation functionality was working, though more work still was to be done. HaikuDepot was added to the nightly images 'hrev48421'. These "nightly images" are provided mainly for development and testing purposes. <ref name=https://www.haiku-os.org/blog/bonefish/2013-09-28_package_management_goes_live <ref name=https://download.haiku-os.org/nightly-images/x86_gcc2_hybrid/ 

Stephan Aßmus created the Google Code project for the web application that provides the additional package related information, like screenshots, user ratings and comments. It also helped with evaluating the stability of packages and assigning them to respective repositories. A small group of developers was formed to tackle the task of designing and implementing the web application.<ref name=https://www.haiku-os.org/blog/bonefish/2013-09-28_package_management_goes_live

References 

Haiku